En Kelvikku Enna Bathil is a 1978 Indian Tamil-language action drama film directed by P. Madhavan and written by Balamurugan. The film stars Rajinikanth, Vijayakumar, Sripriya and M. N. Nambiar. It revolves around a man seeking to get revenge on his uncle for duping his father. The film was released on 9 December 1978.

Plot 

Saravana and Muruga are brothers whose father was duped by their uncle Sivaraman, who borrowed a large sum of money but failed to return it after his business flourished. Their father is left in a miserable condition and the brothers are separated with Muruga growing up to become a coward and Saravana, a criminal who is arrested. When Saravana is released after some years, he is determined to avenge his father's dignity and reunite with his brother.

Cast 
 Rajinikanth as Saravana
 Vijayakumar as Muruga
 Sripriya as Rosy and Alamelu
 M. N. Nambiar as Sivaraman
 Manorama as Chinthamani
Y. G. Mahendran as servant of Sivaraman
C. K. Saraswathi as Muruga's aunt
T. M . Samikannu as Samikannu
Peeli Sivam as Nallasivam
V. S. Raghavan as Muruga's uncle
Suruli Rajan as Chinthamani's love interest
Cylone Manohar as Raja
Veeraraghavan as Alamelu's stepfather
Vijayachandrika as school headmistress

Production 
En Kelvikku Enna Bathil was directed by P. Madhavan, written by Balamurugan and produced by T. K. Gopinath under Arun Prasad Movies. Cinematography was handled by P. N. Sundaram, and the editing by R. Devarajan. Vijayakanth was initially chosen for a role however he was removed due to not being good at dialogue delivery.

Themes 
En Kelvikku Enna Bathil, like many Rajinikanth films of the late 1970s and 1980s, had metamorphosis and vengeance as its dominant narrative.

Soundtrack 
All songs were written by Kannadasan and Muthulingam. The soundtrack was composed by M. S. Viswanathan.

Release and reception 
En Kelvikku Enna Bathil was released on 9 December 1978. The film was a commercial success, and with that Rajinikanth "carved out for himself a niche in vendetta roles".

References

Bibliography

External links 
 

1970s action drama films
1970s Tamil-language films
Films directed by P. Madhavan
Films scored by M. S. Viswanathan
Indian action drama films
Indian films about revenge